The N969 is a provincial road in the province of Groningen in the Netherlands. It runs from Blijham through Bellingwolde and Rhederbrug, all in the municipality of Westerwolde, to the German border.

Route description 
It starts in Blijham in the municipality of Westerwolde. It then runs southeast via Bellingwolde and Rhederbrug in the same municipality, and ends at the German border.

Junction and exit list

References 

969
Westerwolde (municipality)